The Dark Leaves is the eighth studio album by Matt Pond PA, released on April 13, 2010. The album was produced in a cabin in Bearsville, NY by Matt Pond and Chris Hansen.

Track listing

"Starting" – 3:50
"Running Wild" – 4:21
"Specks" – 3:49
"Remains" – 5:35
"Sparrows" – 2:50
"Brooklyn Fawn" – 3:56
"Ruins" – 3:47
"Winter Fawn" – 5:15
"The Dark Leaves Theme" – 3:29
"First Song" – 2:36

References

External links
matt pond PA, "The Dark Leaves" by Billboard

2010 albums
Matt Pond PA albums